Aso oke hat, known as fila in the Yoruba language, is a soft hat traditionally worn by the Yoruba people of Western Africa. It is made of hand-woven aso oke fabric, cotton, velvet, or damask. They are usually lined with cotton, but can be unlined if crafted to be worn for a single event. 

Although these hats originated amongst the Yoruba in Nigeria they are worn by men of other African ethnicities and of African descent. Worn exclusively by men, the fila fits snugly around the head, and it is commonly worn pushed to one side, resting above the wearer's ear. However, it can be "shaped" in a variety of ways, according to the personal taste of the wearer. It is said by some that fila when worn to the right signifies an unmarried man, while wearing it to the left indicates a married man. 

It is commonly worn with Yoruba causal attire and required wearing when dressing formally in an Agbada (also made with aso oke, lace or cotton) or brocade dashiki suits. A notable instance of a fila being worn for a special occasion was actor John Boyega wearing one to the Star Wars: The Rise of Skywalker premiere.

See also
Agbada
Dashiki
Kufi
Senegalese kaftan
Yoruba people

References

External links
Nigerian wedding photos

African clothing
Hats
Yoruba art
Yoruba culture